Chakhmakhly is a town in the Qazax District of Azerbaijan.

See also
 Qazakh District

References 

Populated places in Qazax District